Winslow (formerly Summit Home) is a city in southern Washington County, Arkansas, United States. The population was 391 at the 2010 census. It is part of the Northwest Arkansas region.

History
A stagecoach stop for many years, the community now known as Winslow first received a post office on December 11, 1876, known as Summit Home. The town grew significantly upon completion of the Winslow Tunnel, which allowed the St. Louis – San Francisco Railway (Frisco) to run through the steep Boston Mountains of south Washington County. The town was renamed to Winslow on August 3, 1881 in honor of Edward F. Winslow, president of the Frisco Railroad. The town became a somewhat resort town for its picturesque peaks at the end of the 19th century, drawing many wealthy from the Fort Smith area to summer there. It was incorporated on February 17, 1905.

Geography
Winslow is located at  (35.798546, -94.131381).

Demographics

As of the census of 2010, there were 391 people, 146 households, and 105 families residing in the city. The racial makeup of the city was 95.9% White, 0.3% Black or African American, 0.5% Native American, 0.8% from other races, and 2.6% from two or more races.  2.0% of the population were Hispanic or Latino of any race.

There were 146 households, out of which 24.7% had children under the age of 18 living with them, 56.2% were married couples living together, 12.3% had a female householder with no husband present, 3.4% had a male householder with no wife present, and 28.1% were non-families. 24.0% of all households were made up of individuals, and 7.5% had someone living alone who was 65 years of age or older.  The average household size was 2.68 and the average family size was 3.15.

The distribution of age in Winslow reflects a change in the population that has occurred between 2000 and 2010 as the percentage of individuals under the age of 18 has dropped from 28.6% to 21.5% and individuals 24-44 dropped from 23.3% to 20.2%. All other age categories have in turn risen, those 18 to 24 have risen from 8.0% to 9.7%, those age 45 to 64 rose 25.8 to 33.5%, and those who were 65 years of age or older rose from 14.3% to 22.4%. This population shift is likely a result of the closure of the Winslow Public School district, as families with children left the area and new families have not replaced them. The median age was 43.6 years.  For every 100 females, there were 109.1 males.

The median income for a household in the city was $32,692, and the median income for a family was $45,000. Males had a median income of $31,389 versus $41,719 for females. The per capita income for the city was $15,415.  About 11.5% of families and 23.6% of the population were below the poverty line, including 30.9% of those under age 18 and 13.7% of those age 65 or over.

Education

It is within the Greenland School District, and served by Greenland High School in Greenland.

For many years, Winslow had its own school system, the Winslow School District. It served the city and nearby rural areas in the southern portion of Washington County.  By most counts, enrollment for grades K-12 was usually in the mid-20s per grade.

The district became part of the Greenland school district on July 1, 2004, after the Arkansas Legislature passed a state law that mandated districts with less than 350 students consolidate (Winslow had 273 students).  The high school, which actually served grades 7-12, closed at the end of the 2004–2005 school year.  The graduating class at the 2005 spring ceremony had 14 seniors.  Winslow Elementary for grades K-6 was retained for a time following the high school closure. However, in November 2006, the Greenland School Board voted to close that school at the end of the 2006–2007 school year after two years with an enrollment of about 90 students. The mascot of Winslow Public Schools was the Fighting Squirrels.

The majority of the student body did not go to Greenland. They instead opted to transfer to the West Fork school district. The voters of Winslow are currently petitioning the Arkansas Department of Education and Arkansas Legislature to change Winslow's former district from Greenland to West Fork.

The Winslow campus now houses the Winslow Public Library, Friends of the Library Bookstore, and Internet Cafe in the old High school building.

Notable people
Kevin Carson, research associate and author 
Maude Duncan, American newspaperwoman and a former mayor of Winslow
Douglas C. Jones, Western historical writer, born in Winslow
John Joshua Webb, Old West gunman died in Winslow in 1882

See also
 Devil's Den State Park

References

External links
Encyclopedia of Arkansas History & Culture entry: Winslow (Washington County)

Cities in Arkansas
Cities in Washington County, Arkansas
Populated places established in 1905
Northwest Arkansas
1876 establishments in Arkansas